The 2022 Malaysia Quadrangular Series was a Twenty20 International (T20I) cricket tournament took place in Malaysia in July 2022. The participating teams were the hosts Malaysia along with Bhutan, Maldives and Thailand.

The Maldives squad travelled to Sri Lanka to play five practice matches before arriving in Malaysia for the series. In the week before the tournament, Malaysia travelled to Singapore to play a three-match T20I series for the Stan Nagaiah Trophy.

The hosts won all six of their games in the round-robin stage. Malaysia defeated Bhutan by 9 wickets in the final.

Squads

Round-robin

 Advanced to the final

Final

References

External links
 Series home at ESPN Cricinfo

Associate international cricket competitions in 2022
Sports competitions in Malaysia
Malaysia Quadrangular Series